Benjamin John Heneghan (born 19 September 1993) is an English professional footballer who plays as a defender for Sheffield Wednesday. He previously played for Chester, Motherwell, Sheffield United and AFC Wimbledon,  as well as loan spells with Blackpool.

Career

Early years
Heneghan started his career at Everton, where he spent seven years. In 2012, he made the move to Stoke City, where he was a regular in the Under-21 Premier League and had a loan spell at struggling Northern Premier League side Droylsden. He didn't make a senior appearance for Stoke and was released at the end of the 2013–14 season. He then spent time on trial at Oldham Athletic and Accrington Stanley.

Chester
Heneghan joined Chester in August 2014, initially on non-contract terms. On 16 August, he debuted as a half-time substitute against Braintree Town coming on at right back. On 30 August, Heneghan made his first start for Chester, against Gateshead replacing captain Matty Brown. He maintained his place in the squad playing mostly as a right back. On 24 September, Heneghan scored his first professional goal, a 94th-minute winner against Cross-border derby rivals Wrexham. Two days later he an agreed contract until the end of the season. Heneghan switched to his preferred central back position in January, when Chester finally signed right back Ryan Higgins. On 30 March, Heneghan and Higgins signed new contracts until the end of the 2015–16 season. Heneghan finished the season as a first choice centre back playing 44 matches and scoring eight goals, including valuable ones against Stockport County and Southend United in FA Cup matches.

Heneghan started the 2015–16 season building a strong partnership in the middle of the defence with the experienced Ian Sharps, but was sent-off in the fifth game of the campaign as Chester lost 5–2 to Woking. On 19 September, Heneghan scored the winning goal against Eastleigh. During the season Heneghan was reported to be attracting interest from clubs in the Football League and in Scotland, though he had not ruled out remaining with Chester.

Motherwell
On 23 June 2016, Scottish Premiership club Motherwell confirmed the signing of Heneghan on a two-year deal. He made his début in a 2–0 home defeat against Rangers in the Scottish League Cup. The defender spent a year in Scotland, playing exactly 50 games in all competitions, scoring one goal in a 2–1 home loss in the Scottish Premiership against Rangers.

Sheffield United
On 31 August 2017, Heneghan signed for Championship club Sheffield United on a three-year contract. He made his first and what turned out to be only appearance for Sheffield United in an FA Cup tie against Preston North End in January 2018. He was transfer-listed by Sheffield United at the end of the 2017–18 season.

On 3 July 2018, Heneghan moved to Blackpool on a season-long loan. After a difficult start, Heneghan settled into a defence that regularly kept clean sheets and became a fans favourite by the end of the season.

On 23 August 2019, Heneghan returned to Blackpool on a loan deal until January. In January, this was extended until the end of the season.

Heneghan left Sheffield United at the end of the 2019–20 season, having been released on a free transfer.

AFC Wimbledon
On 19 November 2020, Heneghan joined League One club AFC Wimbledon, having been a free agent following his release by Sheffield United. The length of contract was not disclosed. He made his debut for Wimbledon as a substitute against Rochdale on 21 November 2020. In his second appearance for the club he scored his first goal, in a 2–1 defeat to Gillingham on 24 November.

Sheffield Wednesday
On 14 June, it was announced Heneghan would join League One side Sheffield Wednesday following the expiry of his AFC Wimbledon contract. He made his Wednesday debut, starting against Portsmouth on 30 July 2022. In a match against Lincoln City on 22 October 2022, he would pick up a potential season-ending knee injury..

Career statistics

Club

References

External links

1993 births
Living people
English footballers
Everton F.C. players
Stoke City F.C. players
Chester F.C. players
Motherwell F.C. players
Sheffield United F.C. players
Blackpool F.C. players
AFC Wimbledon players
Sheffield Wednesday F.C. players
National League (English football) players
Scottish Professional Football League players
English Football League players
Footballers from Manchester
England semi-pro international footballers
Association football defenders
Droylsden F.C. players